Anthracomartidae, first described by Haase, 1890, is a family of the extinct arachnid order Trigonotarbida. It is likely to be most closely related to the Archaeomartidae, based on a 2014 cladistic analysis, within the clade (Palaeocharinus (Archaeomartidae + Anthracomartidae)).

Genera

Anthracomartus Karsch, 1882
Brachylycosa Frič, 1904
Brachypyge  Woodward, 1878
Cleptomartus  Petrunkevitch, 1949
Coryphomartus  Petrunkevitch, 1945
Cryptomartus  Petrunkevitch, 1945
Maiocercus  Pocock, 1911
Oomartus  Petrunkevitch, 1953
Pleomartus  Petrunkevitch, 1945
Promygale  Frič, 1904

References 

Trigonotarbids
Paleozoic arachnids
Silurian arachnids
Devonian arachnids
Permian arachnids
Carboniferous arachnids
Prehistoric arthropod families